Lysine-specific histone demethylase 1A (LSD1) also known as lysine (K)-specific demethylase 1A (KDM1A) is a protein in humans that is encoded by the KDM1A gene. LSD1 is a flavin-dependent monoamine oxidase, which can demethylate mono- and di-methylated lysines, specifically histone 3, lysines 4 and 9 (H3K4 and H3K9).  This enzyme can have roles critical in embryogenesis and tissue-specific differentiation, as well as oocyte growth. KDM1A was the first histone demethylase to be discovered though more than 30 have been described.

Structure 

This gene encodes a nuclear protein containing a SWIRM domain, a FAD-binding motif, and an amine oxidase domain. This protein is a component of several histone deacetylase complexes, though it silences genes by functioning as a histone demethylase.

Function 

LSD1 (lysine-specific demethylase 1), also known as KDM1, is the first of several protein lysine demethylases discovered.  Through a FAD-dependent oxidative reaction, LSD1 specifically removes histone H3K4me2 to H3K4me1 or H3K4me0.  When forming a complex with androgen receptor (and possibly other nuclear hormone receptors), LSD1 changes its substrates to H3K9me2. It's now known LSD1 complex mediates a coordinated histone modification switch through enzymatic activities as well as histone modification readers in the complex.

Function of KDM1A gene can be effectively examined by siRNA knockdown based on an independent validation.

Interactions 

KDM1A has many different binding partners, which may be necessary for its demethylation activity. In acute myeloid leukemia (AML), GFI1B was definitively demonstrated to maintain an interaction with KDM1A that is necessary for the proliferation of the disease. Evidence for the role of KDM1A interactions with nuclear GSK3β in promoting the progression of certain cancers is also present. High levels of nuclear GSK3β were found to promote the binding of KDM1A to the deubiquitinase, USP22, which prevent the breakdown of KDM1A and cause it to accumulate in higher levels. The accumulation of KDM1A has been correlated with tumor progression in certain cancers, including glioblastoma, leukemia, and osteosarcoma.

Clinical significance 

KDM1A appears to play an important role in the epigenetic "reprogramming" that occurs when sperm and egg come together to make a zygote. Deletion of the gene for KDM1A can have effects on the growth and differentiation of embryonic stem cells. Deletion in mouse embryos is lethal; embryos do not progress beyond Day 7.5. KDM1A is also thought to play a role in cancer, as poorer outcomes can be correlated with higher expression of this gene. Therefore, the inhibition of KDM1A may be a possible treatment for cancer. KDM1A tends to be overexpressed in the tumor cells of certain cancers such as bladder, lung, and colorectal cancers. The specificity of KDM1A overexpression in these cancers creates the potential for targeted molecular therapy treatments, through the use of KDM1A-specific siRNAs.

Mutations 

De novo mutations to KDM1A have been reported in three patients, each with developmental delays believed to be attributable in part to the mutations. All documented mutations are missense substitutions. One of the affected families has created a public website in order to identify further cases.

See also 
 Histone methylation

References

External links